Wild Mood Swings is the tenth studio album by English rock band the Cure, released on 7 May 1996 by Fiction Records.

Release 
Wild Mood Swings charted at number nine on the UK Albums Chart, staying on chart for six weeks, and charted at number 12 in the US Billboard 200. Four singles were released from the album, the first being "The 13th", released in April 1996, followed by "Mint Car" released in June, "Strange Attraction" released in United States in October and "Gone!" released in Europe in December 1996.

"Jupiter Crash" was played on the 2004 Curiosa Tour, and "Want" was usually played as the third song during the 2000 Bloodflowers Tour.  "Treasure", "Jupiter Crash", "Mint Car", and "Want" have been played at various points since 2000, with "Want" being a set staple.

The album did considerably badly compared to other Cure albums, as it was described as 'out of fashion' to the 90s and too close to 'Wish.' (1992) It's not very popular within the fandom, because it was completely different from their other works; Robert Smith, frontman, seems to have a different light on the album, stating it is one of his 'favourite Cure albums.'

Reception 

Wild Mood Swings received a mixed response from critics. A favourable review came from Trouser Press, which described the album as "a potent and sweeping dissertation on melancholy and tentative dreams denied", calling it "consistently compelling". However, the album was the lowest-selling Cure album in 12 years, and it marked the beginning of a downward trend in the Cure's future album sales.

Track listing
All songs by Bamonte, Cooper, Gallup, O'Donnell and Smith.

Bonus track

Personnel
The Cure
Robert Smith – guitar, six-string bass, vocals, production, sleeve art direction
Perry Bamonte – guitar, six-string bass, keyboard, sleeve art direction
Jason Cooper – percussion, drums (except on "This is a Lie","Club America", "Mint Car", "Trap" and "Treasure"), sleeve art direction
Simon Gallup – bass guitar, sleeve art direction
Roger O'Donnell – keyboard, sleeve art direction

Additional personnel

Jesus Alemany – trumpet
John Barclay – trumpet
Steve Dawson – trumpet
Richard Edwards – trombone
Sid Gauld – trumpet
Will Gregory – saxophone
Steve Sidwell – trumpet
Mister Chandrashekhar – violin
Sue Dench – viola
Leo Payne – violin
Audrey Riley – cello
Chris Tombling – violin
Ronald Austin – drums on "This is a Lie"
Louis Pavlou – drums on "Club America"
Mark Price – drums on "Mint Car", "Trap" and "Treasure"
 Ronald Austin – arrangements
 Sid Gauld – arrangements
 Will Gregory – arrangements
 Audrey Riley – arrangements

Technical

 Steve Lyon – production, engineering, mixing
 Paul Corkett – mixing
 Spike Drake – mixing
 Paul Q. Kolderie – mixing
 Tom Lord-Alge – mixing
 Alan Moulder – mixing
 Tim Palmer – mixing
 Mark Saunders – mixing
 Adrian Maxwell Sherwood – mixing
 Sean Slade – mixing
 Ian Cooper – mastering
 Andy Vella – sleeve art direction

Charts

Weekly charts

Year-end charts

Certifications

References

1996 albums
The Cure albums
Elektra Records albums
Fiction Records albums